Simulia may refer to:
 Simulia (company)
 Simulia (Odisha Vidhan Sabha constituency)